Creobroter urbanus is a species of praying mantis in the family Hymenopodidae.

See also
List of mantis genera and species

References

u
Mantodea of Asia
Insects described in 1775